Superchunk is the debut studio album by American indie rock band Superchunk. It was recorded January 18–19, 1990, at Duck Kee Studios in Raleigh, North Carolina, and released on Matador Records in 1990.

"Slack Motherfucker" was named the 19th best single of the 1990s by Spin, and the 81st best song of the 1990s by Pitchfork. On August 25, 2017, Superchunk was re-released on vinyl.

Track listing
 "Sick to Move" – 3:14
 "My Noise" – 2:25
 "Let It Go" – 2:53
 "Swinging" – 2:11
 "Slow" – 5:08
 "Slack Motherfucker" – 2:52
 "Binding" – 3:03
 "Down the Hall" – 2:41
 "Half a Life" – 3:42
 "Not Tomorrow" – 4:39

B-sides include "What Do I", "Train From Kansas City", "Night Creatures" and "Garlic".

References

1990 debut albums
Superchunk albums
Matador Records albums